Jamie Sorrentini (also known as Jamie Perez Sorrentini and Jamie Mills) is an American film, television and theatre actress. She starred as Kathy Grovner in the 1987 television movie A Hobo's Christmas. Sorrentini was a cast member during the 2000 United States tour of the 1999 musical Parade. In 2002, she performed in the play Birdie's Bachelorette Party, and appeared on the television program Law & Order: Special Victims Unit.

Early life and education
Sorrentini was born in New Jersey, and began acting in advertisements at the age of seven. She performed off-Broadway with actor Tom Hulce in a production of the play about author Lewis Carroll, titled Haddock's Eyes. Sorrentini studied acting, art history and photography at New York University's Tisch School of the Arts. She attended the Lee Strasberg Theatre and Film Institute program. Sorrentini graduated with a B.F.A. degree from New York University.

Career
Sorrentini starred as Kathy Grovner in the 1987 television movie A Hobo's Christmas. In a review of the movie for The State, Ray Benson singled out Sorrentini's performance. In 2000, Sorrentini appeared in a Harold Prince-directed production of the 1999 Tony Award-winning musical Parade, as part of a U.S. national tour. She was a cast member of the play Birdy's Bachelorette Party in 2001 and 2002. Birdy's Bachelorrette Party received positive reception from Barbara & Scott Siegel in a review in Theatremania. In 2002, Sorrentini portrayed Vincenza Agosto on the television program Law & Order: Special Victims Unit.

Personal life
She is married to singer and musician Tiziano Lugli, and both are former members of the Church of Scientology.

Filmography

Film

Television

See also

Epiphany (Desperate Housewives)
Lists of actresses
List of American film actresses

References

External links
Official website
Jamie Sorrentini, YouTube channel
 
Jamie Sorrentini, at TV Guide
Jamie Sorrentini, at Yahoo! TV

Living people
Actresses from New Jersey
American film actresses
American television actresses
Tisch School of the Arts alumni
American former Scientologists
Year of birth missing (living people)